Ten Years Gone: The Best of Everclear 1994–2004 is a 'Best of' album by Everclear. It was released on October 5, 2004. It includes tracks from all of their albums up to 2003, as well as two tracks not previously released on any album.  "The New Disease" was previously released on a "Volvo Driving Soccer Mom" CD single, and "Sex With a Movie Star (The Good Witch Gone Bad)" did not appear anywhere else.

The cover art and album title of Ten Years Gone: The Best of Everclear 1994–2004 pays homage to both Led Zeppelin and the Rolling Stones. The album title is a reference to the Led Zeppelin song of the same name while the cover art closely resembles that of Exile On Main St., by the Rolling Stones. The title states the years 1994-2004, likely because 1994 is the year that Capitol Records re-released the band's first album World of Noise; however, it was first released in 1993 on Tim/Kerr Records.

Track listing
All songs written by Art Alexakis, Craig Montoya and Greg Eklund except where noted:

References

2004 greatest hits albums
Everclear (band) compilation albums
Albums produced by Art Alexakis